Toledo District is the southern, most and least populated district in Belize. Punta Gorda is the District capital. According to the Human Development Index (HDI), it is the second most developed region in the country. The district has a diverse topography which features rainforests, extensive cave networks, coastal lowland plains, and offshore cays. Toledo is home to a wide range of cultures such as Mopan, Kekchi Maya, Creole, Garifuna, East Indians, Mennonites, Mestizos, and descendants of US Confederate settlers.

Geography
The District has many villages, including Monkey River Town and the Toledo Settlement; the Maya villages of San Pedro Columbia, Blue Creek, Indian Creek, Santa Cruz, San Antonio, San Jose, San Felipe; and the Garifuna village of Barranco. It also has a number of Maya ruins, including Lubaantun, Nim Li Punit, Uxbenka, and Pusilha. According to a 2022 mid-year census estimate, Toledo District had a population of 41,537 people, 6,801 of whom lived in Punta Gorda.

Economy

The economy of Toledo relies heavily upon agriculture. Crops grown include beans and corn, as well as rice, which is sold to the Big Falls Rice Mill. Cacao is grown organically and sold via the Toledo Cacao Growers Association to Green & Black's for their renowned Maya Gold chocolate, as well as to chocolatiers within Belize. The District's ancient and modern-day links with chocolate are celebrated annually in May (Commonwealth Day Holiday weekend) at the Toledo Cacao Festival. Farmers grow additional crops such as coffee, yams, sweet potato, hot chili peppers, avocado, oranges and plantain for sale at the market in Punta Gorda, held each Monday, Wednesday, Friday, and Saturday.

Fishermen practice small-scale fishing from their dug-out canoes, as well as diving for lobster and conch during open season. The Port Honduras Marine Reserve just north of Punta Gorda Town is a protected area, and Toledo's waters are regarded as the permit capital of Belize. Many traditional fishermen have trained as fly-fishing guides through the alternative livelihood projects offered by local conservation groups.

Tourism is an important and relatively new industry for Toledo. Once regarded as an area only for the hardy and adventurous, the opening of new tourist accommodation and the development of tours, as well as a growing awareness of the district's high proportion of protected areas, wildlife, excellent birding and the offshore cayes, have resulted in Toledo being recognized as an important emerging destination.

Language 
According to the 2010 census, Mayan languages are spoken by 68.4% of the population. This makes Toledo the only district in Belize where native languages are spoken by a majority.

Gallery

Transportation
The Toledo District is served by the paved Thomas Vincent Ramos Highway, as well as several bush roads to the many rural villages in the District. A regular bus service is provided by Punta Gorda-based James Bus Line, shuttling passengers between the other districts, and Punta Gorda is served by several daily commuter flights on Tropic Air, Maya Island Air and several small, family run bus services that transport passengers to and from the rural villages.

Events
Each year, during the Commonwealth Day weekend, Toledo hosts the Chocolate Festival of Belize. The festival features chocolatiers from across the country as well as chocolate-related arts and crafts. According to the project coordinator for the Toledo Cacao Growers Association Thomas Tillett, the Association currently has a membership of about 1,100 cacao farmers.

Indian Reservations

Aguacate Indian Reservation, Toledo
Black Creek Indian Reservation, Toledo
Blue Creek Indian Reservation, Toledo
Crique Sarco Indian Reservation, Toledo
Graham Creek Indian Reservation, Toledo
Hinchasones Indian Reservation, Toledo
Machaca Indian Reservation, Toledo
Xpicilha Indian Reservation, Toledo

Notable architecture
Several significant ancient Mayan sites are extant in ruined form in the Toledo District. Nim Li Punit is a Classic Period Mayan site with ballcourts and carved stelae.  Lubaantun is a drystone constructed site with ruined pyramids and stone tombs.

Notable people 
Cristina Coc, Maya community leader
Juan Coy, politician
 Michael Espat, politician

See also
 The Forgotten District, a documentary film about ecotourism in Toledo

References

External links
 Official website - with maps and area attractions
 Toledo District at belize.fm
 The Toledo Howler  - quarterly newspaper published by the BTIA Toledo Chapter
 How to Cook a Tapir - a Belize memoir, documenting the author's year-long working honeymoon in the Toledo District
 Treehouse Perspectives - Living High on Little - the story of the Salisbury family's move and new life in Punta Gorda
 Governmental influence on ecotourism in Toledo - Influence or interference?

 
Districts of Belize